2011 Thai League Division 1 is the 14th season of the League since its establishment in 1997. It is the feeder league for the Thai Premier League. A total of 18 teams will compete in the league.

League expansion
It was announced at the end of the 2010 season that the TPL would increase the number of teams for the start of the 2011 Thai Premier League season. Therefore, playoff games were arranged to promote more teams for the Regional League Division 2 and relegate less teams from the TPL. During these games, Nakhon Pathom were banned and therefore will fail to take their place in Division 1 for the next two seasons. This did mean that the league would only feature 17 teams for the season, but with less than 3 weeks before the start of the league campaign another round of playoffs was used to promote one more side, Saraburi.

Changes from last season

Team changes

From Division 1
Promoted to Thai Premier League
 Sriracha
 Khonkaen
 Chiangrai United

Relegated to Regional League Division 2
 Prachinburi
 Narathiwat

To Division 1
Relegated from Thai Premier League
 Bangkok United

Promoted from Regional League Division 2
 Buriram
 F.C. Phuket
 Chiangmai
 Chainat
 Rangsit University JW
 Bangkok
 Saraburi

Clubs serving bans
 Nakhon Pathom - 2 years

Teams

Stadia and locations

Name changes

Suvarnabhumi Customs were renamed Samut Prakan Customs United.
Raj Pracha Nonthaburi were renamed Raj Pracha F.C. Thailand
Chula United were renamed BBCU (Big Bang Chulalongkorn University)
Rangsit University JW were renamed J.W. Rangsit
PTT were renamed PTT Rayong

Ground changes

Chanthaburi moved from the Chanthaburi Stadium to the Rambhai Barni Rajabhat University Stadium
BBCU withdrew from the Chulalongkorn University Stadium after an internal dispute which also formed the new RL club Jamjuree United and ground shared with TPL side Army United at the Thai Army Sports Stadium
Thai Honda moved from the KMITL Sport center football stadium to the Chalermprakiet 72 Sports Center stadium.

League table

Results

Top scorers

Attendance

See also
 2011 Thai Premier League
 2011 Regional League Division 2
 2011 Thai FA Cup
 2011 Kor Royal Cup

References

External links
Official website

2011
2